Lasionycta silacea is a moth of the family Noctuidae. It occurs from the British Columbia Coast Range and the Washington Cascades to extreme south-western Alberta.

It is found near the treeline and is nocturnal.

The wingspan is 32–37 mm for males and 36–38 mm for females. Adults are on wing from early July through August.

External links
A Revision of Lasionycta Aurivillius (Lepidoptera, Noctuidae) for North America and notes on Eurasian species, with descriptions of 17 new species, 6 new subspecies, a new genus, and two new species of Tricholita Grote

Lasionycta
Moths described in 2009